Heijō may refer to: 

Heijō, the Japanese colonial-era name for Pyongyang, the present capital of North Korea
Heijō, South Heian, Japanese colonial-era name for Pyongsong, South Pyongan (a city now in North Korea)
Heijō-kyō, the ancient Japanese capital located in present-day Nara
Emperor Heijō (773-824) 51st emperor of Japan

See also
Heijō Station